Saplings (1945) is an adult novel by Noel Streatfeild, published by Collins, about the Wiltshire middle-class family living in the Regent's Park in pre-Second World War London. With the breakdown of society under German attack, the family undergoes its own rapid disintegration. The novel is written from the perspective of four children - Laurel, Tony, Tuesday, and Kim, as well as from the perspective of their mother, Lena.

Streatfeild mixes fantasy themes of children's books and a more mature psychological realism, to show the total damage caused by war.

In 2004 Saplings was adapted into a ten-part radio series on BBC Radio 4. It was also featured on Radio 4's 'A Good Read' in October 2009.

Saplings was republished by Persephone Books in 2000

References

1945 British novels
Novels set in London
Novels set during World War II
Novels adapted into radio programs
Novels by Noel Streatfeild
William Collins, Sons books